Cantaloupe Hotels is the leisure arm of Cantaloupe and Company a luxury lifestyle brand in Sri Lanka that provides services in event management, jewellery and advertising. Cantaloupe Hotels currently owns and operates two hotels in the Southern Province of the country, Cantaloupe Levels and Cantaloupe Aqua.

History 
Cantaloupe Hotels commenced with the opening of Cantaloupe Aqua in Talpe, Unawatuna, in December 2010. Cantaloupe Hotels started its second hotel, Cantaloupe Levels in Galle, in 2013. The hotel opened in September 2014.  
In 2014, the group announced that they would be expanding  with the opening of Cantaloupe Soul Surf, a 30-room beach resort and surf school in Midigama, Weligama.

Awards 
 Cantaloupe Aqua awarded Gold Award for the website category at the 10th Annual W³ Awards.
 Cantaloupe Levels - Award under the Hotel and Lodging Websites category at the 22nd Communicator Awards.
 Cantaloupe Levels - Best  Luxury New Hotel in the Indian Sub Continent Award by the World Luxury Hotel Awards.  
 Cantaloupe Hotels - winner of Luxury Travel Guide, Asia and Australasia Awards 2016.

References 

Hotel chains in Sri Lanka